Maria Aurora Salvagno (born 3 March 1986) is an Italian female sprinter. She was born in Alghero.

At senior level she has won one medal individually and three with the national relay team in international athletics competitions. She has gained ten caps for the national team from 2007 to 2011.

International competitions

National titles
Maria Aurora Salvagno has won one time the individual national championship.
1 win in the 60 metres indoor (2010)

See also
 Italy national relay team

References

External links
 
 
 Maria Aurora Salvagno at FIDAL 

1986 births
Italian female sprinters
People from Alghero
Living people
Athletics competitors of Centro Sportivo Aeronautica Militare
Sportspeople from Sardinia
Mediterranean Games silver medalists for Italy
Athletes (track and field) at the 2009 Mediterranean Games
Universiade medalists in athletics (track and field)
Mediterranean Games medalists in athletics
Universiade gold medalists for Italy
Competitors at the 2007 Summer Universiade
Medalists at the 2009 Summer Universiade
20th-century Italian women
21st-century Italian women